Adriano Fiorentino (1440–1499), also known as Adriano di Giovanni De' Maestri, was an Italian medallist and sculptor.

Fiorentino was born in Florence. His first job may have been as a servant in the house of Lorenzo de' Medici. He later became a student of Bertoldo di Giovanni, and worked for a long time as a maker of cannons under the command of Virginio Orsini. In 1495 moved to Urbino, then later moved to Germany, but in 1499 he returned to his native city. Fiorentino died in 1499 in Florence.

References

 Additional content translated from corresponding Italian Wikipedia article

15th-century Italian sculptors
Italian male sculptors
Italian medallists
1440 births
1499 deaths
Artists from Florence